John Warrington Van Tongeren is an American keyboardist and composer for films and television.

Biography 
Van Tongeren's career in the entertainment business began as a keyboardist, with one of his earliest projects being the band Q, featuring Jon St. James and Stacey Swain (a.k.a. Stacey Q). Q then became SSQ, which released one album, Playback, on EMI records with John contributing four songs, most notably Anonymous. After leaving SSQ in the early '80s, Van Tongeren became an in-demand session musician and began composing music for movies. As a musician, he has worked with Chicago, Roger Daltrey, Robbie Nevil, John Parr, The Chantoozies, Starship, Jeff Beck, Quincy Jones, Al Jarreau, The Pointer Sisters, Living in a Box, Stryper, and others. He currently works out of The Blue Room, a recording studio in Los Angeles.

Van Tongeren began his film scoring career as one of the original members of Media Ventures (now Remote Control Productions). During his time at Media Ventures Van Tongeren worked on films such as Thelma & Louise, True Romance and Drop Zone with Hans Zimmer. He also collaborated with Mark Mancina on Speed, Moll Flanders, Fair Game, Assassins and Twister.

Van Tongeren then began to compose music for television series, including Poltergeist: The Legacy and the nineties revival of The Outer Limits, which he won awards for. Van Tongeren again collaborated with Mancina on the Speed sequel, Speed 2: Cruise Control, and then worked with Trevor Rabin on the 1998 film Armageddon.

Outside of film and television Van Tongeren was asked to compose three orchestral interludes and contribute production for the late jazz drummer Tony Williams' 1996 album Wilderness.

In the 2000s Van Tongeren continued working on film scores, such as XXX and The Mummy: Tomb of the Dragon Emperor with Randy Edelman, The Passion of the Christ with John Debney, Miss Congeniality 2: Armed and Fabulous and the Disney films The Cheetah Girls and Princess Protection Program. He also scored more sci-fi television series including The 4400, for which he won the BMI award.
His songwriting has led to platinum CDs for Rhythm of the Pride Lands – Disney, and The Cheetah Girls, as well as the Top Ten hit single for Starship, "It's Not Over ('Til It's Over)" and 3 songs on the Wall-E Inspired by CD.

2010 saw projects including Iron Man 2 and Predators with John Debney and movies for Nickelodeon and Disney. John also wrote and produced songs on Disney's Tinker Bell and the Lost Treasure and Bayou Boogie: Inspired by Princess & the Frog.

2014, John is scoring the redux of the classic Tom and Jerry Show for WB, airing on the Cartoon Network. Staying true to the style of the original cartoons from the 1940s and '50s, the series has John writing in a mix of orchestral and old school big band styles. In 2015 Van Tongeren wrote, sang and performed the theme to DreamWorks Animation's Dawn of the Croods, now in its third season on Netflix.

Trinom3 is John's jazz project that has released two albums so far. Details are Sketchy and Just a Bit Further.

Awards 
Van Tongeren has won numerous awards, the most prestigious of which are a Daytime Emmy, BMI Award and two Gemini Awards.

John won an Emmy in 2019 for his scores to WB Animation's The Tom and Jerry Show. In 2005 Van Tongeren won a BMI Cable Award for the television series The 4400; which he shared with Tim P., Stephen Phillips, George S. Clinton and Claude Foisy. In 2000 and 2001 Van Tongeren won the Gemini Award for Best Original Music Score for a Dramatic Series, for The Outer Limits; these were for the episodes "Tribunal" and "Simon Says" respectively.

Personal life 
Van Tongeren grew up in Phoenix, Arizona.

Filmography 

 Dawn of the Croods
 The Tom and Jerry Show (52 episodes, 2014–2016)
 Swindle
 The Suite Life Movie
 Rockin' The Wall
 Den Brother
 The Boy Who Cried Werewolf
 Princess Protection Program
 Twitches Too
 WarGames: The Dead Code
 Christmas Is Here Again
 The 4400 (21 episodes, 2004–2007)
 The Initiation of Sarah
 Thief (6 episodes)
 Masters of Science Fiction (1 episode)
 Wanted (5 episodes)
 Twitches
 Empire
 Miss Congeniality 2: Armed and Fabulous
 Son of the Mask (additional music)
 Jesus the Driver
 Van Helsing: The London Assignment
 The Five People You Meet in Heaven (additional music)
 Lilo & Stitch: The Series (uncredited)
 Don: Plain & Tall
 The Cheetah Girls
 Malibu's Most Wanted
 Teenage Mutant Ninja Turtles (various episodes)
 XXX (additional music)
 The Scorpion King (additional music)
 Disney's The Legend of Tarzan
 The Outer Limits (54 episodes, 1995–2000)
 Red Letters
 Poltergeist: The Legacy (36 episodes, 1996–99)
 The Magnificent Seven (3 episodes, 1998–99)
 Creature
 Armageddon (additional music)
 Speed 2: Cruise Control (additional music)
 Dante's Peak (additional music)
 Metro (additional music)
 Twister (additional music)
 Assassins (additional music)
 Speed (additional music)
 Drop Zone (additional music)
 Monkey Trouble (additional music)
 Renaissance Man (additional music)
 True Romance (additional music)
 Thelma & Louise (additional music)
 The Adventures of the Galaxy Rangers

Discography
 Starship: Love Among the Cannibals
 Steve Porcaro: Someday/Somehow
 Trinom3: Just a Bit Further
 Trinom3: Details are Sketchy

References

External links 
 
 John Van Tongeren at Movie Music UK
 
 

American film score composers
American male film score composers
Place of birth missing (living people)
21st-century American keyboardists
20th-century American keyboardists
Living people
Year of birth missing (living people)
21st-century American male musicians
20th-century American male musicians